The 2013 Karshi Challenger was a professional tennis tournament played on hard courts. It was the seventh edition of the tournament which was part of the 2013 ATP Challenger Tour. It took place in Qarshi, Uzbekistan between 6 and 12 May 2013.

Singles main-draw entrants

Seeds

 1 Rankings are as of April 29, 2013.

Other entrants
The following players received wildcards into the singles main draw:
  Sanjar Fayziev
  Sarvar Ikramov
  Temur Ismailov
  Nigmat Shofayziev

The following players received entry from the qualifying draw:
  Aliaksandr Bury
  Egor Gerasimov
  Vaja Uzakov
  Alexey Vatutin

Doubles main-draw entrants

Seeds

1 Rankings as of April 29, 2013.

Other entrants
The following pairs received wildcards into the doubles main draw:
  Omad Boboqulov /  Pavel Tsoy
  Sanjar Fayziev /  Nigmat Shofayziev
  Sarvar Ikramov /  Batyr Sapaev

Champions

Singles

 Teymuraz Gabashvili def.  Radu Albot, 6–4, 6–4

Doubles

 Chen Ti /  Guillermo Olaso def.  Jordan Kerr /  Konstantin Kravchuk, 7–6(7–5), 7–5

External links
Official Website

Karshi Challenger
Karshi Challenger